Liteyny Municipal Okrug is a municipal okrug of Tsentralny District of the federal city of St. Petersburg, Russia. Population:  

The okrug borders the Neva River in the north, Chernyshevskogo Avenue and Vosstaniya Street in the east, and Nevsky Avenue in the south.

Places of interest include the Vosstaniya Square,  Liteyny Avenue, and Kutuzov Embankment.

References

Tsentralny District, Saint Petersburg